Lyana Merkel Chirinos Pérez (born 21 June 1992) is a Peruvian footballer who plays as a forward. She was a member of the Peru women's national team.

College career
Chirinos attended the Darton State College and the Lindsey Wilson College, both in the United States.

International career
Chirinos represented Peru at the 2008 South American U-17 Women's Championship and the 2012 South American U-20 Women's Championship. At senior level, she played two Copa América Femenina editions (2010 and 2014).

Personal life
Chirinos' paternal grandmother is of Italian descent.

References

1992 births
Living people
Women's association football forwards
Peruvian women's footballers
Footballers from Lima
Peruvian people of Italian descent
Peru women's international footballers
Darton State Cavaliers women's soccer players
Lindsey Wilson Blue Raiders women's soccer players
Peruvian expatriate footballers
Peruvian expatriate sportspeople in the United States
Expatriate women's soccer players in the United States